The 2008 Worthing Borough Council election took place on 1 May 2008 to elect members of Worthing Borough Council in West Sussex, England. One third of the council was up for election and the Conservative Party stayed in overall control of the council. Overall turnout was 35%.

Candidates from five political parties took part in the election from the Conservatives, Liberal Democrats, British National Party, Labour and United Kingdom Independence Party and one candidate standing on a "Stop! Durrington's Overdevelopment – Save Titnore's Trees" platform. The results of the election were declared at a joint count with Adur council, the first time such a joint count had taken place in West Sussex. The count saw an incident where one candidate, Dawn Smith, was arrested after some of her supporters were prevented from entering the count.

The results saw the Conservatives gain three seats to increase their majority on the council. They gained Broadwater ward from the Liberal Democrats, and also Goring where the previous councillor had defected from the Conservatives to the Liberal Democrats. The third Conservative gain was in Offington where the previous councillor, Mark McCarthy, had been elected as a Conservative, but had resigned to sit as an independent Conservative. The Liberal Democrats did make one gain when they took Selden ward, where the previous Conservative councillor had stood down.

After the election, the composition of the council was:
Conservative 25
Liberal Democrat 12

Election result

Ward results

References

External links
Manifestos from each of the parties standing in the election

2008 English local elections
2008
2000s in West Sussex